Jules Shungu Wembadio Pene Kikumba (14 June 1949 – 24 April 2016), known professionally as Papa Wemba, was a Congolese singer and musician who played Congolese rumba, soukous, and ndombolo. Dubbed the "King of Rumba Rock", he was one of the most popular musicians of his time in Africa and played an important role in world music. He was also a fashion icon who popularized the Sape look and style through his musical group Viva la Musica, with whom he performed on stages throughout the world.

Musical history
Papa Wemba's road to fame and prominence began when he joined the music group Zaiko Langa Langa in the late 1960s. This was followed by his success as a founding member both of Isifi Lokole and then Yoka Lokole, along with a short stint as a member of Afrisa International for a few months. During these early stages of his career, he was establishing a style that included traditional Congolese rumba and soukous, infused with traditional African sounds, Caribbean rhythms, rock and soul. But Wemba gained international success and status with his band Viva La Musica, especially after he took them to Paris, France in the early 1980s. It was there that Wemba was able to achieve more of an "eclectic sound" in his work, influenced by western popular music that reflected a European flavor and style, referred to as "Europop." Wemba spoke about this transition in his music during a 2004 interview:

Zaiko Langa Langa 
Papa Wemba was one of the first musicians to join the influential rock-rumba band Zaiko Langa Langa (ZLL) after it was created in December 1969 in Kinshasa, by many well-known Congolese musicians including Nyoka Longo Jossart and Bimi Ombale, among others. He remained with the group for four years.

Papa Wemba (then known as Jules Presley Shungu Wembadio) helped contribute to the success of Zaiko Langa Langa so that, by 1973, it was one of the more successful Congolese groups. By that time, ZLL's shows and performances featured a string of their popular hits, some of them written by Wemba. The latter included "Pauline", "C'est La Vérité", "Chouchouna", and "Liwa Ya Somo".

Zaiko Langa Langa had gained a strong and popular following even in a Congolese musical world that, in those days, was already dominated by various musical acts including Franco Luambo and his band TPOK Jazz, or Tabu Ley Rochereau's various ensembles. ZLL was also vying for an audience with other (at the time) new musical acts such as Bella-Bella and Empire Bakuba.

Isifi Lokole
In December 1974, at the pinnacle of their fame (and just a month after the Rumble in the Jungle between Muhammad Ali and George Foreman in Kinshasa), Papa Wemba (usually called 'Shungu Wembadio' at this point in his career) along with Evoloko Lay Lay, Mavuela Somo and Bozi Boziana, left Zaiko Langa Langa to establish their own musical ensemble Isifi Lokole. Wemba later claimed that ISIFI was an acronym for "Institut du Savoir Ideologique pour la Formation des Idoles," a claim that has still not been given total credence. In July 1975, Shungu Wembadio officially adopted the soon-to-be-well-known-worldwide name Papa Wemba. The "Papa" (father) part of his name had already been given to him as a traditional and cultural rite because he was his mother's first-born son. But in assuming a new name and public persona, "Papa" was now re-emphasized as an allusion to the demanding family responsibilities that Wemba assumed at very young age, since both parents were now deceased: Wemba's father in 1966, followed by his mother in 1973. Isifi Lokole would only last a year together as a group, with the single "Amazone" (a Wemba composition) as its biggest commercial "hit" record.

Yoka Lokole
In November 1975, Papa Wemba, Mavuela Somo and Bozi Boziana left Isifi Lokole to create the group Yoka Lokole (also known as The Kinshasa's Wa Fania All-Stars). Yoka Lokole contributed to the African pop music wave with their hit songs including "Matembele Bangui", "Lisuma ya Zazu" (Papa Wemba), "Mavuela Sala Keba", and "Bana Kin" (Mavuela Somo).

Like Isifi Lokole, the electronic-instrument-driven Yoka Lokole would not last much longer than a year. After a year of modest success, controversies within Yoka Lokole over money and prestige were also complicated by Wemba's arrest and brief incarceration in Kinshasa Central prison in December 1976 when he was suspected of having a relationship with army general's daughter. The band continued to tour without Papa Wemba. For whatever reason (or reasons), whether it was personal or professional (with one source speculating that he was perhaps feeling diminished in the public's eye), by 1977 Wemba had formed a new group, and called it Viva la Musica.

Viva la Musica
In 1977–78, back home now in the Matonge neighborhood of Kinshasa, Papa Wemba set out to create his group Viva la Musica. This new band's name was suggested to him in 1974, when he attended a concert in Kinshasa that featured the New York-based Latinos, Fania All-Stars. During the concert, one of the singers would shout to the audience "Viva La Musica!" to an enthusiastic response. Wemba's vision was to structure Viva la Musica around young, talented but largely unknown artists, including the singers Prince Espérant, Jadot "le Cambodgien" Sombele, Debaba el Shabab, Pepe Bipoli and Petit Aziza, and various guitarists such as Rigo Star, Syriana, and Bongo Wende. The new group included the traditional instrument lokole. There was also an associated dance, the mukonyonyo, as well as a fashion style.

The band achieved immediate success and, during their first year performing together, the Kinshasa newspaper Elima named the band "best orchestra" and their single, "Mère Supérieure," best song. During the following three years, Viva la Musica built on these initial accolades with more hit songs including "Moku Nyon Nyon", "Nyekesse Migue'l", and "Cou Cou Dindon". As time went by, it was revealed that Antoine Agbepa was the unknown writer of many of these songs, when Papa Wemba said, "Ooh! l'homme idée" (Oh! the idea-man!), thereby on-the-spot renaming the impressive young singer-songwriter Koffi Olomide – and the name stuck.

After his success already with three influential groups, in 1977 Papa Wemba established a kind of commune for musicians. To accomplish this, he used his family home (on Kanda-Kanda street) as a fashionable gathering place for Matonge youths. He named it "Village Molokai" and declared himself to be its tribal chief (chef coutumier).

Move to Paris
Beginning in the late 1970s and early 1980s, Wemba (both by himself and with Viva la Musica) started traveling to Paris, believing there was a potentially wider audience for the music he had been helping to create during the preceding decade. As Wemba biographer Craig Harris put it:

By the late 1980s and early 1990s, Wemba's style was more readily identifiable even as it had become an amalgamation of rumba, soukous and ndombolo, Latin and rock, melded to a European-oriented pop style. But still wanting to expand their musical horizons, and move in new musical directions, Viva la Musica took on a dual-identity. Wemba now maintained one group in Kinshasa (called at times "Nouvelle Ecriture", "Nouvel Ecrita" and then again "Viva la Musica") and another one in Paris ("Nouvelle Generation," "La Cour des Grands" and now "Viva Tendance"). The group consistently maintained a high profile in world music with hits like "Le Voyageur" (1992), "Emotion" (1995), "Pole Position" (1996) and "Somo Trop" (October 2003).

By this time, Wemba's use of African, Cuban and Western influences was not only one of Africa's most popular music styles, it was crossing cultural boundaries and attracting a more diverse audience outside of Africa. In 1993, Wemba joined with Peter Gabriel for the latter's Secret World Tour, and this drew attention to Wemba's unique style and groundbreaking sound. The aforementioned Emotion album, released in 1995, showed that he was achieving a global following. This album appeared under Peter Gabriel's Real World record label, and sold more than 100,000 copies.

Legal troubles
In February 2003, Wemba was suspected of being involved in a network that had allegedly assisted hundreds of people in illegally immigrating from the Democratic Republic of the Congo into Europe. At that point he was arrested in Paris and held while awaiting a trial. He then spent three-and-a-half months in prison until a €30,000 bail was posted (some reports claimed it was paid by the Congolese government). In June 2003 Wemba was released from prison which was an experience that, upon his release, he declared had had a profound psychological effect on him. The singer claimed to have undergone a spiritual conversion in jail and even recounted this episode on his album Somo Trop (released in October 2003). On the song "Numéro d'écrou", he recalled the day "God" paid a visit to his cell. In 2004, he was convicted in France, fined, and given a suspended prison sentence.  Wemba returned to the Congo in 2006.

Cultural influence
In 1979, Papa Wemba became the unofficial leader of La Sape (Société des Ambianceurs et des Personnes d'Élégance, literally translated as the "Society of Atmosphere-setters and Elegant People") which he promoted as a youth subculture in Zaire. Their style was influenced by the fashion centres of Paris and Milan. Wemba said:

The Sapeur cult promoted high standards of personal cleanliness, hygiene and smart dress, to a whole generation of youth across Zaire. When I say well groomed, well shaved, well perfumed, it's a characteristic that I am insisting on among the young. I don't care about their education, since education always comes first of all from the family.

After Wemba's death, Cameroonian saxophonist Manu Dibango told the BBC during an interview:

Papa Wemba's impact on the culture is also reflected by his influence on a new generation of musicians and performers. For example, Priyan Weerappuli (leader of the Sri Lankan group Pahan Silu) referred to Wemba as being among his greatest musical influences. Weerappuli claims that he was first introduced to Wemba's music in 2004 and was "deeply inspired by the free rhythms demonstrated by Wemba's Soukous style" and, from that point, "began experimenting with these rhythms in his own compositions."

Many others paid tribute to Papa Wemba's legacy after his death in April 2016. Some of them included not only Koffi Olomide and Manu Dibango (both mentioned previously), but musicians King Kikii and Femi Kuti, along with soccer star Samuel Eto'o (among others) gave testimony to his lasting influence on them.

Film work
Papa Wemba got some attention as a movie actor, primarily because he played the male lead role in a very successful Zairean film La Vie est Belle (Life is Beautiful) [1987] by Belgian director Benoît Lamy and Congolese producer-director Ngangura Mweze. Wemba made another kind of contribution to cinema, thanks to his work on the soundtracks for Children of Men, Besieged, and Black Mic Mac. Wemba is also credited as "composer" of the scores for the films Identity Pieces, Macadam tribu, along with Life is Beautiful..

During his life, Wemba acted in a few more successful films, although he played only minor roles. As recently as 2012, he had a cameo role in the Belgian drama film Kinshasa Kids. Beyond the impact of his important role in Life is Beautiful, there are his many music videos and recorded band performances. Also, Wemba is featured (as himself) in many documentary films which were generally well received including; The Importance of Being Elegant, The Real World of Peter Gabriel and The African Rock 'n' Roll Years (all television) documentaries).

Death
Wemba died at the age of 66 after collapsing on stage in Abidjan, Côte d'Ivoire, during the FEMUA urban music festival on Sunday, 24 April 2016. On Monday, 25 April, it was reported that his widow, Mama-Marie Luzolo Amazone, flew to Abidjan "accompanied by family members and government officials." In Wemba's hometown of Kinshasa, both fellow musicians and fans gathered together as a tribute to his legacy. Similar tributes also took place in Paris, London, Brussels and Nairobi.

Selected discography

Studio albums

Papa Wemba, EMI France (1988)
Le Voyageur, Real World Records / Virgin Records (1992)
Foridoles (1994)
Emotion, Real World Records / Virgin Records (1995) FR #129 US #14(World)
Molokaï, Real World Records / Virgin Records (1998)
Nouvelle Ecriture dans L (1998)
M’Zée Fula-Ngenge (1999)
Légende (2001)
Notre Père Rumba (2009)

Live albums

Papa Wemba Au Japon (1986)
Papa Wemba Live New Morning, Real World Records (2006)

Other albums

Wake Up (with Koffi Olomide) (1996)
Big Blue Ball, Real World Records / Rykodisc (2008) BE #37 FR #13 US #130

Filmography
 Les Habits neufs du gouverneur (The Governor's New Clothes) (2005)
 Combat de fauves (Wild Games) (1997) – role: "The African"
 La Vie est Belle (Life Is Beautiful) [alternate title: Life Is Rosy] (1987) – role: Kourou
Kinshasa Kids (Kinshasa Kids) (2012)-role: himself

Notes

References

External links

Interview with Papa Wemba in 1995

1949 births
2016 deaths
People from Sankuru
Tetela people
Democratic Republic of the Congo male actors
Democratic Republic of the Congo musicians
Democratic Republic of the Congo people imprisoned abroad
Prisoners and detainees of France
Real World Records artists
Soukous musicians
Musicians who died on stage
Filmed deaths of entertainers